Bronwenia is a genus in the Malpighiaceae, a family of about 75 genera of flowering plants in the order Malpighiales. Bronwenia comprises 10 species of shrubs and woody vines native to Mexico, Central America, and South America.

Species

External link and references

Malpighiaceae Malpighiaceae - description, taxonomy, phylogeny, and nomenclature
 Bronwenia
Anderson, W. R., and C. Davis, 2007. Generic adjustments in Neotropical Malpighiaceae. Contributions from the University of Michigan Herbarium 25: 137–166.

Malpighiaceae
Malpighiaceae genera